Abdou M'Bark El Id (born 16 June 1999), is a Mauritanian international footballer who plays for FK Kukësi.

Club career
In 2019, El Id signed for Spanish side CD Numancia, immediately being assigned to the club's 'B' team. Following a move back to his native Mauritania with FC Nouadhibou, he returned to Europe to join Albanian side FK Kukësi in 2022.

Career statistics

Club

Notes

International

References

External links
 

1999 births
Living people
People from Nouakchott
Mauritanian footballers
Mauritania youth international footballers
Mauritania international footballers
Association football midfielders
Mauritania A' international footballers
2018 African Nations Championship players
Tercera División players
Kategoria Superiore players
ASAC Concorde players
CD Numancia players
CD Numancia B players
FC Nouadhibou players
FK Kukësi players
Mauritanian expatriate footballers
Mauritanian expatriate sportspeople in Spain
Expatriate footballers in Spain
Expatriate footballers in Albania